Heather Thomson could refer to: 

Heather Thomson (soprano) (born 1940), Canadian soprano
Heather Thomson Matthews (born 1946), New Zealand middle-distance runner
Heather Thomson, participant in the reality television show The Real Housewives of New York City

See also
Heather Thompson (disambiguation)